Choi Bong-won (Korean: 최봉원; Japan: チェ ボンウォン; born 16 May 1994 in South Korea) is a South Korean retired footballer.

Career
After failing to make an appearance with Seoul, Choi joined Czech second-tier side Slovan Liberec to become a better player physically. He made his professional debut on 23 September 2015, playing in their 1–1 draw against Varnsdorf in the Czech Cup. However, that would be his only appearance with the team.

For the second half of 2015/16, Choi signed for St. Andrews in Malta before sealing a move back to the Czech second division with MAS Táborsko, where he again made one appearance and mostly played with their B team. From there, he signed for J.FC Miyazaki in the Japanese fifth division.

References

External links
 

Living people
1994 births
South Korean footballers
Association football defenders
FC Slovan Liberec players
St. Andrews F.C. players
FC Silon Táborsko players
Czech National Football League players
Maltese Premier League players
South Korean expatriate footballers
South Korean expatriate sportspeople in the Czech Republic
South Korean expatriate sportspeople in Malta
Expatriate footballers in the Czech Republic
Expatriate footballers in Malta